Bildi is a village and former minor princely state on Saurashtra peninsula in Gujarat, western India.

The village lies at km 612 along the Mathura–Vadodara section railroad, between Morwani and Raoti (Madhya Pradesh).

History
The petty princely state in Gohelwar prant was ruled by Sindi Chieftains. It also comprised only the villages.

In 1901 it has a population of 388, yielding a state revenue of 749 rupees (1903-4, nearly half from land), paying no tribute.

External links
 Imperial Gazetteer on dsal.uchicago.edu - Kathiawar

Princely states of Gujarat